Kevin Bahl (born June 27, 2000) is a Canadian professional ice hockey defenceman for the  New Jersey Devils of the National Hockey League (NHL).

Playing career
Bahl was drafted by the Arizona Coyotes in the 2nd round of the 2018 NHL Entry Draft while playing major junior hockey with the Ottawa 67's of the Ontario Hockey League (OHL). He was signed by the Coyotes to a three-year, entry-level contract on March 15, 2019. 

During his final season of junior hockey in the 2019–20 season, Bahl was included by the Coyotes in a trade along with Nick Merkley, Nate Schnarr, a conditional first-round pick in 2020, and a conditional third-round pick in 2021 to the New Jersey Devils in exchange for Taylor Hall and Blake Speers on December 16, 2019.

In the following 2020–21 season, Bahl made his NHL debut for the Devils on April 29, 2021.

Career statistics

Regular season and playoffs

International

Awards and honours

References

External links
 

2000 births
Living people
Arizona Coyotes draft picks
Binghamton Devils players
Canadian ice hockey defencemen
New Jersey Devils players
Ottawa 67's players
Utica Comets players